(literally "chicken congee"), or simply , is a popular chicken soup of Portuguese, Cape Verdean, and Brazilian cuisine. The Portuguese term  literally means "hen", but became the generic name for the species, much like chicken in English. Portuguese chicken congee has the rice much more cooked than in most Western chicken soup recipes, but it is not disintegrated as in the Asian one.

General recipe

Portugal
The basic ingredients include chicken, and usually small pasta (like alphabet pasta or pevide pasta) or sometimes rice. Common flavoring ingredients are carrot, eggs, olive oil, mint, saffron, clove, white pepper, salt and pepper. It is usually accompanied by slices of Portuguese broa bread  (corn bread) on the side for dipping. This is only a variation of this recipe.

Brazil
The Brazilian recipe for flu uses whole pieces of chicken from the areas with more bones, fried in a very light refogado using a sole smashed garlic clove (fried in vegetable oil until golden but never toasted), has the rice and vegetables (generally solely potato and carrots, in very small cubes; rarely peeled tomato) boiled in broth much more cooked than the usual, and might call for parsley and green onions. Generally no seasoning are used besides light use of salt, sauteed garlic and onion (added before the boiling process), black pepper, parsley and green onion.

Customs
 is usually consumed by Brazilians, Portuguese and Cape Verdeans when they have a cold. In Portugal, Cape Verde and Brazil,  is widely believed to help a person overcome colds, digestive problems, and other mild forms of sickness. In Cape Verde,  is sometimes served after the funeral, at the home of the deceased, perhaps because it "soothes" the heart. It is also served in that country during special occasions, such as New Year's Eve, birthdays, and other special family events.

Since  is very simple and light, it is often consumed before a main course meal as well as a late supper.

See also
 Caldo de pollo, canja's much "heavier" Hispanic American relative
 List of soups

Portuguese soups
Brazilian soups
Stock (food)